The Malinowski Memorial Lecture is an annual lecture series hosted by the Department of Anthropology of the London School of Economics in commemoration of Professor Bronisław Malinowski, considered one of most influential figures in the history of the discipline. It has been delivered annually since 1959 by young anthropologists deemed influential to the discipline. Notable speakers include Edmund Leach, Maurice Bloch, Peter Riviere, Tim Ingold and David Graeber.

References

British lecture series
London School of Economics
1959 establishments in the United Kingdom